Jolpajaja (possibly from Quechua qullpa salty, salpeter, qaqa rock, "salpeter rock") is a mountain in the Vilcanota mountain range in the Andes of Peru, about  high. It is located in the Cusco Region, Quispicanchi Province, in the districts of Camanti and Marcapata, and in the Puno Region, Carabaya Province, Ollachea District. Jolpajaja is situated northeast of Puicutuni. Piqui Machay lies to the west.

References

Mountains of Cusco Region
Mountains of Puno Region
Mountains of Peru